Events in the year 2016 in Kuwait.

Incumbents
Emir: Sabah Al-Ahmad Al-Jaber Al-Sabah 
Prime Minister: Jaber Al-Mubarak Al-Hamad Al-Sabah

Events

References

 
2010s in Kuwait
Years of the 21st century in Kuwait
Kuwait
Kuwait